Allred is an unincorporated community in Overton County, Tennessee, United States. The zip code is: 38457.

Notes

Unincorporated communities in Overton County, Tennessee
Unincorporated communities in Tennessee